William "Bill" Lafferty (1931–2003) was a politician, Canadian Forces officer and news paper columnist from Northwest Territories, Canada. He served as a member of the Northwest Territories Legislature from 1975 until 1979.

Lafferty was first elected to the Northwest Territories Legislature in the 1975 Northwest Territories general election. He won the Mackenzie-Laird electoral district defeating incumbent Nick Sibbeston. Lafferty would only serve a single term in office and would not return when the legislature was dissolved in 1979.

He died in 2003 due to cancer.

External links
 Remembering Bill Lafferty Northern News Service

Members of the Legislative Assembly of the Northwest Territories
1931 births
2003 deaths
Canadian people of Métis descent
Deaths from cancer in Canada
People from Fort Simpson